Bhawania is a genus of polychaete worms in the family Chrysopetalidae.

References

External links 

 

Polychaete genera
Phyllodocida